Štúrovo (before 1948: Parkan; ,) is a town in Slovakia, situated on the River Danube. Its population in 2018 was 10,279.

The town is situated opposite the Hungarian city of Esztergom. The Mária Valéria bridge connects the settlements. The bridge was destroyed in 1944 during World War II, but reconstructed in 2001.

Names and etymology
The initial name of the settlement was Kokot – the common Slavic word for a rooster (the word still exists in Slovak as a vulgarism). Kokot (1075), Cokot (1157), Kakath (1277). Later Slovak and Hungarian name was adopted from Turkish Cigerdelen Parkani (1543) –  "the fortress stabbing to the liver of the enemy".  It was given its current name after World War II and is named after the 19th century Slovak national leader, Ľudovít Štúr.  There was an attempt to return to the old name in a local 1991 referendum; however the government refused to rename the town. The Hungarian name Párkány is officially used as a name in the minority language.

History

The town was inhabited in the prehistoric ages, thanks to its favourable location. It was an important river crossing, and part of the Limes Romanus system named as Avanum during Roman rule. In the 16th century, after the Turks conquered Buda in 1541, the town, along with Esztergom, came under the Ottoman rule. Many attempts to retake the town from the Turks followed, but they were unsuccessful except 1595–1605 period, until 1683, when the Turks lost a battle near Párkány which became referred to as Ciğerdelen ("Liver driller" in Turkish) during the Ottoman rule.

During the reign of Maria Theresa, the town regained its rights and became a district town.

In 1850, Párkány became a station on the railway between Pressburg (now Bratislava) and Budapest. In 1895, the Mária Valéria bridge to Esztergom was opened.

After World War I, the town became a border town of Czechoslovakia. In 1938, as a result of the First Vienna Award, Párkány and parts of Southern Slovakia were occupied by Hungary. It was liberated in the years 1944/1945 by Soviet troops. The Mária Valéria bridge was destroyed for a second time (first time in 1920) by retreating German forces.

After World War II, with the annulment of the Vienna Awards, the town became a part of Czechoslovakia again.  It was renamed to Štúrovo in 1948. The formerly independent villages of Nána and Obid were merged with the town in 1960 and 1972 respectively. Štúrovo ceased to be the seat of a separate district in 1960 and was merged into the new larger Nové Zámky District.

The postwar industrialisation period saw a major pulp and paper processing plant opened - the Juhoslovenské celulózky a papierne (South Slovakian Pulpwood and Paper Works) in 1968, employing some 4,000 people. A new thermal swimming resort Vadaš was built in 1978. The local railway station became the second largest in Slovakia (1975).

After the Velvet Revolution, Nána (1990) and Obid (1998) became separate villages again. The Mária Valéria bridge to Hungary was rebuilt for the third time and opened in 2001, boosting the local economy.

Border crossing

Until 21 December 2007 when both Slovakia and Hungary became part of the Schengen Area, Štúrovo was a major border crossing between Slovakia and Hungary, with Esztergom located on the Hungarian side of the River Danube. The two cities are linked by the Mária Valéria bridge.

The bridge was originally opened on 28 September 1895 but was destroyed twice. On 22 July 1919 the bridge was destroyed by a detonation at its first pier on its western side but the bridge was renovated in 1922 and completely reconstructed in 1926. During World War II, retreating German troops blew up the bridge on 26 December 1944 along with other bridges near Esztergom.

Decades of intransigence between the Communist governments of Hungary and Czechoslovakia meant that the bridge was not rebuilt until the new millennium, finally reopening on 11 October 2001. Half the costs of the project were covered by a 10 million Euro grant from the European Union, as part of the EU PHARE project to assist applicant countries in their preparations to join the EU.

Štúrovo was also a major railway border crossing between Slovakia and Hungary as it is on the main Bratislava-Budapest railway line. The main station across the border in Hungary is Szob which is located to the east on the same side of the River Danube.

Demographics

According to the 2001 census, 11,708 people were living in the town with 68.7% identifying themselves as ethnic Hungarian, 28.1% as Slovak and 3.2% as other nationalities.
The religious make-up was: Roman Catholic 77.18%, without denomination or not specified 16.45%, Evangelical 1.36%.

Twin towns — sister cities

Štúrovo is twinned with:

 Esztergom, Hungary
 Bruntál, Czech Republic
 Castellarano, Italy
 Baraolt, Romania
 Novi Bečej, Serbia
 Kłobuck, Poland
 Kőbánya (Budapest), Hungary

References

External links

 Official website 
 Thermal swimming resort Vadaš
 Virtual Tour of Štúrovo

Cities and towns in Slovakia
Populated places on the Danube
Socialist planned cities
Hungary–Slovakia border crossings
Hungarian communities in Slovakia